23 Andromedae, abbreviated 23 And, is a presumed single star in the constellation Andromeda, although it has been a suspected spectroscopic binary. 23 Andromedae is the Flamsteed designation. Its apparent visual magnitude is 5.71, which indicates it is dimly visible to the naked eye under good viewing conditions. The star is moving further from the Earth with a heliocentric radial velocity of −27 km/s.

The stellar classification of 23 And is F0 IV, matching an F-type subgiant star that is in the process of evolving into a red giant. It displays a slight microvariability with a frequency of 0.85784 d−1 and an amplitude of 0.0062 magnitude. The star is around 759 million years old with a projected rotational velocity of 36 km/s. It has 1.43 times the mass of the Sun and is radiating 50 times the Sun's luminosity from its photosphere at an effective temperature of 7,089 K.

References

F-type subgiants
High-proper-motion stars
Andromeda (constellation)
Durchmusterung objects
Andromedae, 23
000905
001086
0041